The 1950 Dunedin mayoral election was part of the New Zealand local elections held that same year. In 1950, elections were held for the Mayor of Dunedin plus other local government positions including twelve city councillors. The polling was conducted using the standard first-past-the-post electoral method.

Donald Cameron, the incumbent Mayor, declined to run for a third term. He was succeeded by councillor Len Wright who narrowly defeated the Labour Party candidate Hubert Brown. There was also a swing against the Citizens' association on the city council with both the Labour Party and Citizens' tickets winning six seats each.

Mayoral results

Council results

References

Mayoral elections in Dunedin
1950 elections in New Zealand
Politics of Dunedin
1950s in Dunedin
November 1950 events in New Zealand